Arky may refer to:

 Arky Michael, an Australian actor
 Arky Vaughan, member of the Baseball Hall of Fame
 Arky, a robot in the Manhunter comic book series
 A nickname for a person named Archibald
 A nickname for a person from the US state of Arkansas

See also

 Arki (disambiguation)
 Arkie
 Arkies
 Arkley